Odorant-binding protein 2B is a protein that in humans is encoded by the OBP2B gene.

References

Further reading 

Lipocalins